John Croes (June 1, 1762 – July 26, 1832) was a prelate in the Episcopal Church who served as the first Bishop of New Jersey.

Early life and education
Croes was born on June 1, 1762, in Elizabeth, New Jersey, the son of two German immigrants Jacob Croes and Charlotte Christiana Feigart. He served in the Revolutionary War as a sergeant and quartermaster. He studied for the ministry of the Episcopal Church and was ordained deacon by Bishop William White in Philadelphia, on February 28, 1790, and priest on March 4, 1792.

Career
Croes was uniformly active and zealous in the service of the Church, in both diocesan and general conventions. He first served as rector of Trinity Church, Swedesboro, New Jersey, and was called as rector of Christ Church, New Brunswick, New Jersey, in 1801, and also served as principal of Rutgers Preparatory School. 

Walter Herbert Stowe wrote in 1966, that Croes was symbolic of the Episcopal Church ceasing to be exclusively English, coming from a lower class background, restoring a more democratized and simple Christian character to the episcopate without pomp and circumstance, and rejuvenating the standing of the church in New Jersey. 

He was elected bishop of New Jersey in the summer, and was consecrated at St Peter's Church in Philadelphia on November 19, 1815. He is buried beneath the chancel of Christ Church in New Brunswick, New Jersey.

See also
 Succession of Bishops of the Episcopal Church in the United States

External links
Historical material by John Croes from Project Canterbury
https://web.archive.org/web/20080820044519/http://www.scils.rutgers.edu/~lesk/church/

References 

1762 births
1832 deaths
People from Elizabeth, New Jersey
New Jersey militiamen in the American Revolution
19th-century Anglican bishops in the United States
People of colonial New Jersey
Burials in New Jersey
Educators from New Jersey
American people of German descent
Episcopal bishops of New Jersey